The 169th Battalion, CEF was a unit in the Canadian Expeditionary Force during the First World War.  Based in Toronto, Ontario, the unit began recruiting during the winter of 1915/16 in that city.  After sailing to England in October 1916, the battalion was absorbed into the 5th Reserve Battalion on January 24, 1917.

The 169th Battalion, CEF had one Officer Commanding: Lieut-Col. J. C. Wright.

References
Meek, John F. Over the Top! The Canadian Infantry in the First World War. Orangeville, Ont.: The Author, 1971.

External links
Nominal Roll

Battalions of the Canadian Expeditionary Force